|}

The Prix du Petit Couvert is a Group 3 flat horse race in France open to thoroughbreds aged three years or older. It is run at Longchamp over a distance of 1,000 metres (about 5 furlongs), and it is scheduled to take place each year in September.

History
The event was originally held at Chantilly, and it is named after a crossroads in Chantilly Forest. It was established in 1867, and was initially an 800-metre race for horses aged two or older. It was run in the second half of October.

The Prix du Petit Couvert was staged at Longchamp in 1880, and extended to 1,000 metres in 1881. It took place at Longchamp again in 1900.

Longchamp became the race's usual venue in 1907, and from this point its distance was 1,100 metres. It was abandoned throughout World War I, with no running from 1914 to 1918. It reverted to 1,000 metres in 1921.

The Prix du Petit Couvert was cancelled twice during World War II, in 1939 and 1940. It was held at Maisons-Laffitte in 1943 and Le Tremblay in 1944.

The race was closed to two-year-olds and switched to September in 2002. It now serves as a trial for the following month's Prix de l'Abbaye de Longchamp.

Records

Most successful horse (3 wins):
 Fine Art – 1944, 1945, 1946
 Repertory – 2000, 2001, 2003

Leading jockey (7 wins):
 Roger Poincelet – Fine Art (1944, 1945, 1946), Damnos (1948), Palariva (1956), L'Epinay (1960, 1962)
 Yves Saint-Martin – La Sega (1961), Texanita (1963), Silver Shark (1965), Sun Sun (1968), Manjam (1979), Park Romeo (1981), Bold Apparel (1983)

Leading trainer (9 wins):
 François Mathet – Reinata (1955), Edellic (1958, 1959), La Sega (1961), Texanita (1963, 1964), Silver Shark (1965), Sun Sun (1968), Moubariz (1974)

Leading owner (7 wins):
 Edmond Blanc – La Negligente (1889), Fantasia (1891), Manitou (1897), Mauvezin (1899), Caius (1902), Fils du Vent (1909), Porte Maillot (1911)

Winners since 1980

Earlier winners

 1867:
 1868: Manette
 1869: Mademoiselle de Fligny
 1870–73: no race
 1874: Saltimbanque
 1875: Marmiton
 1876: Pensacola
 1877: Pensacola
 1878: Virginie
 1879: Mademoiselle Mars
 1880: Belgirate
 1881: Pistache
 1882: Ontario
 1883:
 1884: Metropole
 1885: Artois
 1886: Entrechat
 1887: Modiste
 1888: Master Albert
 1889: La Negligente
 1890: Paradisia
 1891: Fantasia
 1892: C'est Sa Soeur
 1893: Sylphine
 1894: Dinette
 1895: Beatrix
 1896: Aunt Minie
 1897: Manitou
 1898:
 1899: Mauvezin
 1900: Wilhelmina
 1901: Limousin
 1902: Caius
 1903:
 1904: Morning Dew
 1905:
 1906: Syphon
 1907: Princess Margaret
 1908: Prestissimo
 1909: Fils du Vent
 1910: Garance
 1911: Porte Maillot
 1912: Amadou / Radial *
 1913: La Malfiera
 1914–18: no race
 1919: La Chiffa
 1920: Maskara
 1921: Honeysuckle
 1922: Sir Gallahad
 1923: Heldifann
 1924: Niceas
 1925: Mackwiller
 1926: Addis Ababa
 1927: Gerbert
 1928: Echappade
 1929: Clarawood
 1930: Democratie
 1931: Epitaphe
 1932: Faria
 1933: Shining Tor
 1934: Bao Dai
 1935: Limac
 1936: Ethiopie
 1937: Aziyade
 1938: Iskandar
 1939–40: no race
 1941: Wigombirou
 1942: Dogat
 1943: Wigombirou
 1944: Fine Art
 1945: Fine Art
 1946: Fine Art
 1947: Solina
 1948: Damnos
 1949:
 1950:
 1951: Pareo
 1952: Pierrot Bleu
 1953: Vamarie
 1954: Vamarie
 1955: Reinata
 1956: Palariva
 1957:
 1958: Edellic
 1959: Edellic
 1960: L'Epinay
 1961: La Sega
 1962: L'Epinay
 1963: Texanita
 1964: Texanita
 1965: Silver Shark
 1966: Yours
 1967: Yours
 1968: Sun Sun
 1969: Pentathlon
 1970: Calahorra
 1971: Deep Diver
 1972: Rambling Rose
 1973: D'Urberville
 1974: Moubariz
 1975: Realty
 1976: Girl Friend
 1977: Girl Friend
 1978: Polyponder
 1979: Manjam

* The 1912 race was a dead-heat and has joint winners.

See also
 List of French flat horse races

References
Racing Post/France Galop:

 france-galop.com – A Brief History: Prix du Petit Couvert.
 galopp-sieger.de – Prix du Petit Couvert.
 horseracingintfed.com – International Federation of Horseracing Authorities – Prix du Petit Couvert (2016).
 pedigreequery.com – Prix du Petit Couvert – Longchamp.

Open sprint category horse races
Longchamp Racecourse
Horse races in France
Recurring sporting events established in 1867